Bambuseria is a genus of flowering plants belonging to the family Orchidaceae.

Its native range is Indian subcontinent to Southern China.

Species:

Bambuseria bambusifolia 
Bambuseria crassicaulis

References

Eriinae
Podochileae genera